Nguyễn Đức Hòa (born 13 July 1989) is a Vietnamese chess Grandmaster (GM) (2014), Vietnamese Chess Championship winner (2014), two-times Asian Team Chess Championship team bronze medal winner (2012, 2014).

Biography
In 2014, Nguyễn Đức Hòa won Vietnamese Chess Championship. He is a multiple International Chess Tournaments winner, include Penang (2012, 2015), Bhubaneswar (2017), Bhopal (2017), Mumbai (2017).

Nguyễn Đức Hòa played for Vietnam in the Chess Olympiad:
 In 2010, at reserve board in the 39th Chess Olympiad in Khanty-Mansiysk (+1, =2, -1),
 In 2012, at fourth board in the 40th Chess Olympiad in Istanbul (+2, =7, -1),
 In 2014, at third board in the 41st Chess Olympiad in Tromsø (+5, =3, -2).

Nguyễn Đức Hòa played for Vietnam in the Men's Asian Team Chess Championships:
 In 2012, at third board in the 17th Asian Team Chess Championship in Zaozhuang (+5, =1, -2) and won team bronze medal,
 In 2014, at third board in the 18th Asian Team Chess Championship in Tabriz (+4, =1, -3) and won team bronze medal.

In 2011, he was awarded the FIDE International Master (IM) title and received the FIDE Grandmaster (GM) title three years later.

References

External links
 
 
 

1989 births
Living people
Vietnamese chess players
Chess grandmasters
Chess Olympiad competitors
Chess players at the 2010 Asian Games
20th-century Vietnamese people
21st-century Vietnamese people